Daniel Escalante (born 9 September 1950) is a sailor from Mexico. Escalante represented his country at the 1972 Summer Olympics in Kiel, Germany. Escalante took 23rd place in the Soling with Armando Bauche as helmsman and Esteban Gerard as fellow crew member.

References

Living people
1950 births
Mexican male sailors (sport)
Sailors at the 1972 Summer Olympics – Soling
Olympic sailors of Mexico